The Inner Harbor Navigation Canal (IHNC) Seabrook Floodgate Structure is a flood barrier in the Industrial Canal in New Orleans, Louisiana. The floodgate is designed to protect the Industrial Canal and the surrounding areas from a storm surge from Lake Pontchartrain.

The building of the floodgate was authorized by Congress in 2006 and will operate in tandem with the Lake Borgne Surge Reduction Barrier to reduce the risk of storm surge damage to some of the New Orleans region's most vulnerable areas – New Orleans East, metro New Orleans, the Ninth Ward, Gentilly, and St. Bernard Parish.

Design
Other components of the Seabrook Floodgate project include building T-wall and replacing the existing Alabama Great Southern Railroad gate with a new taller gate that meet the 100 year level of risk reduction the Corps strives to achieve by 2011; constructing new T-walls that will tie the into a new vehicle gate being built at the boat launch on Leon C. Simon Drive; and raising the Hayne Boulevard ramps on both the east and west sides of the canal. When complete, the Seabrook structure will close the only remaining gap on the East Bank of the Hurricane and Storm Damage Risk Reduction System.

Status
The US Army Corps of Engineers awarded the construction of the project to Alberici Constructors, Inc. in July 2009 Construction started in the fall of 2010, and although construction activities will continue beyond the Corps' projected June 1, 2011, deadline, a temporary cofferdam will be built to reduce risk to the area during the construction.

The floodgate structure opened to marine traffic in August 2012. The same month it was closed for the first time, in order to protect the city from Hurricane Isaac.

Notes

Flood barriers
Buildings and structures in New Orleans
United States Army Corps of Engineers
Flood control in the New Orleans metropolitan area